The Tendaguru Formation, or Tendaguru Beds are a highly fossiliferous formation and Lagerstätte located in the Lindi Region of southeastern Tanzania. The formation represents the oldest sedimentary unit of the Mandawa Basin, overlying Neoproterozoic basement, separating by a long hiatus and unconformity. The formation ranges in age from the late Middle Jurassic to the Early Cretaceous, Oxfordian to Hauterivian stages, with the base of the formation possibly extending into the Callovian.

The Tendaguru Formation is subdivided into six members; from oldest to youngest Lower Dinosaur Member, the Nerinella Member, the Middle Dinosaur Member, Indotrigonia africana Member, the Upper Dinosaur Member, and the Rutitrigonia bornhardti-schwarzi Member. The succession comprises a sequence of sandstones, shales, siltstones, conglomerates with minor oolitic limestones, deposited in an overall shallow marine to coastal plain environment, characterized by tidal, fluvial and lacustrine influence with a tsunami deposit occurring in the Indotrigonia africana Member. The climate of the Late Jurassic and Early Cretaceous was semi-arid with seasonal rainfall and the eustatic sea level was rising in the Late Jurassic from low levels in the Middle Jurassic. Paleogeographical reconstructions show the Tendaguru area was located in the subtropical southern hemisphere during the Late Jurassic.

The Tendaguru Formation is considered the richest Late Jurassic strata in Africa. The formation has provided a wealth of fossils of different groups; early mammaliaforms, several genera of dinosaurs, crocodyliforms, amphibians, fish, invertebrates and flora. The faunal assemblage of the Tendaguru is similar to the Morrison Formation of the central-western United States, with an additional marine interbed fauna not present in the Morrison.

The dinosaur fauna found in the formation is similar to that of other highly fossiliferous stratigraphic units of the Late Jurassic; among others the Kimmeridge and Oxford Clays of England, the Sables de Glos, Argiles d'Octeville, Marnes de Bléville of France, the Alcobaça, Guimarota and Lourinhã Formations of Portugal, the Villar del Arzobispo Formation of Spain, the Shishugou, Kalazha and Shangshaximiao Formations in China, the Toqui Formation of Chile and Cañadón Calcáreo Formation and the Morrison Formation, with the presence of dinosaurs with similar counterparts, e.g., Brachiosaurus and Stegosaurus in the Morrison, and Giraffatitan and Kentrosaurus in the Tendaguru.

Description 

The Tendaguru Formation represents the oldest sedimentary unit in the Mandawa Basin, directly overlying Neoproterozoic basement consisting of gneiss. The contact contains a large hiatus, a missing sequence of stratigraphy, spanning the Paleozoic, Triassic and Early Jurassic. The formation is unconformably overlain by late Early Cretaceous sediments of the Makonde Formation, that forms the top of several plateaus; Namunda, Rondo, Noto, and Likonde-Kitale.

Based on extended geological and paleontological observations the "Tendaguruschichten" (Tendaguru Beds) were defined by Werner Janensch as expedition leader and Edwin Hennig in 1914 to define a sequence of Late Jurassic to Early Cretaceous strata, exposed in the Tendaguru area, which is named after Tendaguru Hill.

Stratigraphy 
The Tendaguru is divided into 6 members, which represent different depositional environments, with the 'Dinosaur Beds' representing terrestrial facies while the beds with genus/species names represent marine interbeds with shallow marine to lagoonal facies. In ascending order these are: the Lower Dinosaur Member, the Nerinella Member, the Middle Dinosaur Member, Indotrigonia africana Member, the Upper Dinosaur Member, and the Rutitrigonia bornhardti-schwarzi Member.

Paleogeography and depositional environment

Paleogeography 

The Tendaguru Formation was deposited in the Mandawa Basin, a post-Karoo, Mesozoic rift basin located between the Ruvu Basin and Rufiji Trough to the north and the Ruvuma Basin to the south. To the west of the basin, Archean and Early Proterozoic basement rocks crop out. The main rift phase in present-day southeastern Africa led to the separation of Madagascar and the then-connected Indian subcontinent happened during the Early Cretaceous. The Songo Songo and Kiliwani gas fields are located just offshore the basin.

At time of deposition was undergoing a semi-arid climate with coastal influences that maintained somewhat higher moisture levels than seen inland. The upper parts of the formation, the Middle Dinosaur and Rutitrigonia bornhardti-schwarzi Members in particular, showed prevailing semiarid conditions with pronounced dry seasons, based on palynologic analysis. The Tendaguru fauna was stable through the Late Jurassic.

During the Late Jurassic and Early Cretaceous, the Gondwana paleocontinent was breaking up and the separation of the Laurasian and Gondwana supercontinents resulted from the connection of the Tethys Ocean with the proto-Atlantic and the Pacific Ocean. In addition, the South Atlantic developed towards the end of the Late Jurassic with the separation of South America and Africa. Africa became increasingly isolated from most other continents by marine barriers from the Kimmeridgian into the Early Cretaceous, but retained a continental connection with South America. Global sea levels dropped significantly in the Early Jurassic and remained low through the Middle Jurassic but rose considerably towards the Late Jurassic, deepening the marine trenches between continents.

Depositional environment 

The sedimentary rocks and fossils record a repeated shift from shallow marine to tidal flat environments indicating that the strata of the Tendaguru Formation were deposited near an oscillating strandline which was controlled by sea level changes. The three dinosaur-bearing members are continental to marginal marine and the three sandstone-dominated members are marginal marine in origin.

Nerinella Member
The composition of benthic molluscs and foraminifera, euhaline to mesohaline ostracods, and dinoflagellate assemblages indicate marine, shallow water conditions for the Nerinella Member, in particular for the lower part. Sedimentation occurred as tidal channel fills, subtidal and tidal sand bars, minor storm layers (tempestites), and beach deposits. Overall, the Nerinella Member represents a variety of shallow subtidal to lower intertidal environments influenced by tides and storms.

Middle Dinosaur Member
The sedimentological characteristics of the basal part of the Middle Dinosaur Member suggest deposition on tidal flats and in small tidal channels of a lagoonal paleoenvironment. The ostracod Bythocypris sp. from the member indicates polyhaline to euhaline conditions. Slightly higher up, a faunal sample dominated by the bivalve Eomiodon and an ostracod assemblage composed of brackish to freshwater taxa is indicative of a brackish water paleoenvironment with distinct influx of freshwater as revealed by the nonmarine ostracod genus Cypridea, charophytes, and other freshwater algae. The paleoenvironment of the ostracod assemblages of the Middle Dinosaur Member changed upsection from a marine setting in the basal parts through alternating marine-brackish conditions to freshwater conditions in the higher parts of this member. The highly sporadic occurrence, in this part of the section, of molluscs typical of marginal marine habitats indicates only a very weak marine influence, at sabkha-like coastal plains with ephemeral brackish lakes and ponds are recorded in the upper part of the Middle Dinosaur Member. This part also contains pedogenic calcretes indicating subaerial exposure and the onset of soil formation. The calcrete intraclasts within adjacent sandstone beds testify to erosive reworking of calcrete horizons. The presence of crocodyilforms indicates freshwater to littoral environments and adjacent terrestrial areas.

Indotrigonia africana Member
The coarse-grained sandstone of the lower part of the Indotrigonia africana Member that shows highly variable transport directions is interpreted as deposits of large tidal channels. Grain-size, large-scale sedimentary structures, and the lack of both trace fossils and epifaunal and infaunal body fossils suggest high water energy and frequent reworking. This basal succession passes upward in cross-bedded sandstone and minor siltstone and claystone with flaser or lenticular bedding that are interpreted as tidal flat and tidal channel deposits. Horizontal to low-angle cross-bedded, fine-grained sandstone with intercalated bivalve pavements indicates tidal currents that operated in small flood and ebb tidal deltas and along the coast. Stacked successions of trough cross-bedded, medium- to coarse-grained sandstone of the upper part of the Indotrigonia africana Member are interpreted as tidal channel and sand bar deposits. At some places in the surroundings of Tendaguru Hill, these sediments interfinger with oolitic limestone layers that represent high-energy ooid shoals.

They contain mud clasts, reworked concretions and/or accumulations of thick-shelled bivalves (mainly Indotrigonia africana and Seebachia janenschi), and exhibit megaripple surfaces. These conglomeratic sandstone layers are interpreted as storm deposits. Overall, lithofacies and the
diverse macroinvertebrate and microfossil assemblages of the Indotrigonia africana Member suggest a shallow marine environment. Based on the diverse mesoflora and the abundance of Classopollis, a nearby vegetated hinterland is postulated that was dominated by xerophytic conifers.

Upper Dinosaur Member
The small-scale trough and ripple cross-bedded fine-grained sandstone at the base of the Upper Dinosaur Member is interpreted as tidal flat deposits. Unfossiliferous sandstone in the upper part
was most likely deposited in small fluvial channels in a coastal plain environment, whereas argillaceous deposits were laid down in still water bodies such as small lakes and ponds. Rare occurrences of the ostracod Cypridea and charophytes signal the influence of freshwater, whereas the sporadic occurrence of marine invertebrates suggests a depositional environment close to the sea.

Rutitrigonia bornhardti-schwarzi Member
Fining upward sequences of the basal part of the Rutitrigonia bornhardti-schwarzi Member are interpreted as tidal channel fills, the overlying fine-grained sandstone, silt- and claystone as tidal flat deposits. From the immediate surroundings of Tendaguru Hill, invertebrates and vertebrates are poorly known and limit the palaeoenvironmental interpretation of this member. The composition of the land-derived sporomorph assemblage suggests a terrestrial vegetation which was dominated by cheirolepidiacean conifers in association with ferns.

Excavation history 

Because of its morphology, the hill was locally known as "steep hill": "tendaguru" in the language of the local Wamwera people. Sattler sent a report of the discoveries that found its way to German palaeontologist Eberhard Fraas, then on a round trip through Africa, who visited the site in 1907 and with the aid of Sattler recovered two partial skeletons of enormous size.

Following the discovery in 1906, teams from the Museum für Naturkunde, Berlin (1907–1913), and the British Museum (Natural History), London (1924–1931) launched a series of collecting expeditions that remain unequalled in scope and ambition. Led by the vision and influence of geologist Wilhelm von Branca, the German expeditions were particularly successful, in large part because the project was taken up as a matter of national ambition (Germany was then a young nation, having been unified by von Bismarck less than 40 years earlier) and enjoyed the benevolence of many wealthy patrons. Eventually, nearly 250 tons of bones, representing an entirely new dinosaur fauna that remains the best understood assemblage from all of former Gondwana, was shipped to Berlin.

From there, the material was transported to Fraas' institution, the Royal Natural History Collection in Stuttgart, Germany. Fraas described two species in the badly known genus "Gigantosaurus"; G. robustus and G. africanus (today Janenschia robusta and Tornieria africana, respectively).

German Tendaguru Expedition 
The Berlin's Natural History Museum excavated at Tendaguru hill and in the surroundings for four years. From 1909 through 1911, Werner Janensch as expedition leader and Edwin Hennig as assistant directed excavations, while Hans Reck and his wife Ina Reck led the 1912 field season. Other European participants include Hans von Staff. In the rainy seasons the scientists explored the geology of the colony German East Africa on long safaris.

Public discussion about provenance and restitution 
In the context of international discussion about the provenance and possible restitution of colonial heritage, as discussed for example in the 2018 report on the restitution of African cultural heritage, both German as well as Tanzanian commentators have called the claim to rightful ownership by the Berlin museum into question. The Tanzanian government has, however, not submitted any official demand for repatriation. German authorities have preferred to offer information on the provenance and research by increasing cooperation between Tanzanian paleontologists and museums with their German counterparts.

In popular culture 
In 1998, an illustrated book in Swahili, whose title translates as Dinosaurs of Tendaguru, was published for young readers in East Africa. It presents a slightly different, fictitious story of the first discovery, which is attributed to a Tanzanian farmer, rather than to the German engineer Sattler.

Paleontological significance 
Possible dinosaur eggs have been recovered from the formation.

The fauna of the Tendaguru Formation has been correlated with the Morrison Formation of the central-western United States, several formations in England, among which the Kimmeridge Clay and Oxford Clay, and France (Sables de Glos, Argiles d'Octeville, Marnes de Bléville), the Alcobaça, Guimarota and Lourinhã Formations of Portugal, the Villar del Arzobispo Formation of Spain, the Shishugou, Kalazha and Shangshaximiao Formations of China, and the Toqui Formation of the Magallanes Basin, Chile and the Cañadón Calcáreo Formation of the Cañadón Asfalto Basin in central Patagonia, Argentina.

Fossil content

Mammaliaformes

Pterosaurs

Ornithischians

Sauropods

Theropods

Crocodyliformes

Amphibians

Fish

Invertebrates

Gastropods

Bivalves

Coral

Ostracods

Flora

See also 

 List of stratigraphic units with dinosaur body fossils
 List of African dinosaurs
 Manda Formation, Triassic fossiliferous formation of Tanzania
 Usili Formation, Permian fossiliferous formation of Tanzania
 Mugher Mudstone, Tithonian fossiliferous formation of Ethiopia
 Ksar Metlili Formation, Tithonian to Berriasian fossiliferous formation of Morocco
 Kirkwood Formation, Berriasian to Hauterivian fossiliferous formation of South Africa
 Sundays River Formation, Valanginian to Hauterivian fossiliferous formation of South Africa
 Bajada Colorada Formation, Berriasian to Valanginian fossiliferous formation of Argentina
 Dinosaurs of Tendaguru, Book for young readers in Swahili

Notes and references

Notes

References

Bibliography 
Geology
   Material was copied from this source, which is available under a Creative Commons Attribution 4.0 International License.
    Material was copied from this source, which is available under a Creative Commons Attribution 4.0 International License.
 

Paleontology
   Material was copied from this source, which is available under a Creative Commons Attribution 4.0 International License.
 
 
 
 
   Material was copied from this source, which is available under a Creative Commons Attribution 4.0 International License.
 
   
  
 
  
 
   
 
  
 
  
  
 
 
  
 
  
  
 
  

 
Geologic formations of Tanzania
Jurassic System of Africa
Jurassic Tanzania
Lower Cretaceous Series of Africa
Cretaceous Tanzania
Sandstone formations
Shale formations
Siltstone formations
Conglomerate formations
Limestone formations
Shallow marine deposits
Tidal deposits
Deltaic deposits
Lacustrine deposits
Lagoonal deposits
Paleontology in Tanzania
Rufiji-Ruvuma languages